The Dark Arena is the first novel by Mario Puzo, published in 1955.

The book follows Walter Mosca, an American World War II veteran who returns to Germany for his girlfriend, Hella. The novel explores life in post-war Germany, a place where the standard currency is not the German mark, or even the U.S. dollar, but U.S.-made cigarettes.

Reception 
The novel was not nearly as successful as his later works. The reviewers gave it modest acclaim, and admitted that Puzo had "solid talent."

References

External links 
 

1955 American novels
American crime novels
Novels by Mario Puzo
Novels set in Germany
Random House books
1955 debut novels